Arnold Zdebiak (born 11 May 1993) is a Polish bobsledder. He competed in the four-man event at the 2018 Winter Olympics.

References

External links
 

1993 births
Living people
Polish male bobsledders
Olympic bobsledders of Poland
Bobsledders at the 2018 Winter Olympics
People from Żary County